The list of shipwrecks in September 1822 includes some ships sunk, foundered, grounded, or otherwise lost during September 1822.

1 September

3 September

6 September

7 September

8 September

10 September

11 September

12 September

17 September

18 September

19 September

21 September

23 September

24 September

25 September

26 September

27 September

29 September

Unknown date

References

1822-09